Eleanor Modrakowska (March 29, 1879 – April 2, 1956) was an American painter. Her work was part of the painting event in the art competition at the 1932 Summer Olympics.

References

1879 births
1956 deaths
20th-century American painters
American women painters
Olympic competitors in art competitions
People from Queens, New York
20th-century American women artists